Alapars is a village in the Kotayk Province of Armenia. The village has 860 dwellings, a school, house of culture, and library. The population is entirely Armenian.

Toponymy 
The village was previously known as Aylaberk and Aylaber.

History 
Alapars was founded in 470. Its center is dominated by the churches of Saint Vartan (Vartanavank) built in 901 (rebuilt 19th century) by a Prince Grigor, and the Holy Mother of God (Surb Astvatsatsin) of 1897. Also in the vicinity is the monastery of S. Tsiranavor. According to local folklore, Vartanavank contains a drop of blood from the Armenian national hero Vartan Mamikonian.

Gallery

Notable people 
 Avetik Avetyan, USSR multiple medalist and director of the pump station of Alapars
 Mushegh Aliabertsi, Patriarch (490-561)
 Tatik Saryan, artist
 Melik Kocharyan, dramatist
 Shavigh Grigoryan, folk collector
 Kavalenko Shahgaldyan, Governor of the Kotayk Province

References

External links 

 
 
 

Populated places in Kotayk Province